Sextette is a 1978 musical comedy film directed by Ken Hughes and released by Crown International Pictures. It stars Mae West, alongside an ensemble cast including Timothy Dalton, Dom DeLuise, Tony Curtis, Ringo Starr, Keith Moon, George Hamilton, Alice Cooper and Walter Pidgeon.

Produced by Daniel Briggs, Robert Sullivan and Harry Weiss for the production company Briggs and Sullivan, the screenplay was dramatized for the screen by Herbert Baker, from West's final stage performance play of the same title, later renamed Sextet, which West herself had written (based on a story idea by Charlotte Francis) and originally performed in 1961. Costumes were designed by Edith Head.

Filmed at Paramount Studios, Sextette was West's final film, as well as that of Pidgeon and Moon. Featured were cameos by Rona Barrett, Regis Philbin and George Raft, all of whom appeared as themselves. The film was a major box office bomb, grossing just $50,000 against an estimated budget of $4–8 million.

Plot
American movie star and sex symbol Marlo Manners is in London, England, where she has just married for the sixth time. She and her new husband Sir Michael Barrington depart for a honeymoon suite at a posh and exclusive hotel that has been reserved for them by her manager Dan Turner. The hotel is also the location of an international conference, where leaders have come together to resolve tensions and problems that threaten the survival of the world. As the chairman, Mr. Chambers is trying to call the meeting to order, the delegates are crowding to the windows in an effort to catch a glimpse of Marlo when she arrives.

As they enter the lobby, Marlo, now Lady Barrington, and her husband, a knight, are swarmed by admirers and reporters. When asked "Do you get a lot of proposals from your male fans?" she quips "Yeah, and what they propose is nobody's business." Once inside their suite, the couple are unable to go to bed and have sex because of constant interruptions due to the demands of her career, such as interviews, dress fittings and photo sessions, as well as the various men, including some former husbands, diplomat Alexei Andreyev Karansky, director Laslo Karolny, gangster Vance Norton and an entire American athletic team, all of whom want to have sex with her.

Meanwhile, Turner desperately searches for an audiotape containing his client's memoirs in order to destroy it. Marlo has recorded extensive details about her affairs and scandals, with a lot of dirt about her husbands and lovers. Ex-husband Alexei, Russian delegate at the conference, threatens to derail the intense negotiations unless he can have another sexual encounter with her. Marlo is expected to work "undercover" to ensure world peace.

Cast

Production

Source material
The film was based on a play by West, which in 1954 she was talking about having written. The play debuted in 1961. Alan Marshall and Jack La Rue played her leading men. Marshall died during the run of the show after suffering a heart attack on stage during a performance of the play.

Development
In 1969, James Aubrey of MGM commissioned Leonard Spigelgass to write a script. In August 1969, West was filming Myra Breckinridge. She said she wanted Christopher Plummer to play one of her husbands in Sextette. However, filming did not proceed. Funds were eventually raised by Danile Briggs, daughter of a Stauffer Chemicals heiress.

In March 1976, it was reported Sextette would be produced for $4.8 million with West receiving $1 million. Four months later, in July 1976, it was reported that the film would be in fact be made for $1.5 million with West getting $250,000 and 20% of the profits. Irving Rapper would direct and Universal had first right of refusal as distributor.

West said Baker's job as screenwriter was "putting in camera shots. I can do that myself but it's too lay. He's not writing' my lines though. No one can do that." AJ Palmerio said he wrote the script which got the film financed but he is not credited on the movie.

Casting
West was reportedly in search of a leading man along the lines of Cary Grant, with whom she had co-starred in She Done Him Wrong. Filming was to start in August. 150 unknowns auditioned on one day. Over a thousand men ended up auditioning. In August, Timothy Dalton was cast after West saw him in Wuthering Heights; eighteen smaller roles would go to the auditionees. "I do the role I always do," said West. "I do Mae West... You see me. I don't take care of myself don't drink or smoke. I've kept my looks." "The script is very funny," said Dalton. "It really is a celebration of Mae West."

Pre-production
Two weeks before filming began, Ken Hughes replaced Irving Rapper as director.

Filming
Principal photography finally commenced in December 1976 at Paramount Studios. The film soon became the source of several urban legends. One such persistent rumor is that the then-84 year old West could not remember any of her lines and had to wear a concealed earpiece under her wig to have her lines fed to her. Tony Curtis later commented that West could not hear well, and thus required the earpiece. Creatively rewriting the story for dramatic effect, in an episode of the program The Dame Edna Experience, he said that because of the frequency of her earpiece she accidentally picked up police radio frequencies, and at one point mistakenly stated "There's a 608!"

In reality, West wore an earpiece so Hughes could feed her lines. Hughes had rewritten most of the dialogue because he and West both felt the script was weak. As a result, West had no time to study the script to memorize her lines. Hughes repeatedly debunked the urban legend that West's earpiece picked up police signals and that West repeated them.

Hughes later stated that with hearing loss, West was unable to take direction, which caused problems in filming. He recalled one incident involving a scene of West in an elevator, which took an entire day to film. After its completion, Hughes wrapped for the day. West was not within hearing range to hear Hughes's call to wrap and remained in the closed elevator for half an hour before being let out.

Dalton had mixed feelings, but complimented West. "I admired her nerve, and enjoyed working with her - I was even interviewed by Rona Barrett in the picture! It was a real stretch for me, and, frankly, after making love to a woman in her mid-80s, I knew I could handle any assignment!"

George Raft, who played himself, had been the star of West's first film, Night After Night, in 1932. The two cinematic legends ended up dying just two days apart in November 1980.

Music
The film features eight songs, seven performed by the cast:
 "Marlo's Theme" – Van McCoy
 "Hooray for Hollywood" – Mae West, Chorus
 "Love Will Keep Us Together" – Timothy Dalton, West
 "Honey Pie" – Dom DeLuise
 "After You've Gone" – West
 "Happy Birthday Twenty-One" – West
 "Baby Face" – West
 "Next Next" – Alice Cooper

Release

Soon after filming ended, the producers had difficulty in finding a major studio to distribute the movie. As a result, producers scheduled several highly publicized sneak previews in order to garner support. The first sneak preview was held on the Paramount Pictures lot and the second was held at the Fox Bruin Theater. At the Bruin Theater, West received a standing ovation afterwards.

After failing to find a distributor, the producers decided to release the film themselves. Sextette premiered at the Cinerama Dome in March 1978. West was moved when she was greeted by thousands of young fans who showed up at the openings, there and in San Francisco. Arthur Knight wrote in The Hollywood Reporter about "a kind of odd gallantry in the octogenarian Mae's loyalty to her public".

Home media
Sextette was released on VHS by Media Home Entertainment in 1982. In April 2011, Scorpion Entertainment released the film on Region 1 DVD in the United States.

In July 2011, Sextette was released as part of Mill Creek Entertainment's Dangerous Babes, a budget-priced, three-DVD set that includes 11 other Crown Pictures films.

Reception

Critical response
Upon its premiere, most critics panned the film. Variety dubbed it "a cruel, unnecessary and mostly unfunny musical comedy." The New York Times''' critic Vincent Canby called Sextette "embarrassing", and said, in reference to West, that "Granny should have her mouth washed out with soap, along with her teeth."

The Los Angeles Times said it "will be cherished by her fans." Filmink said the film "is absurd but almost compulsive in its randomness."

Film critic Rex Reed (who starred with West in the film Myra Breckinridge) also gave the film a negative review, calling the film "a total, unbearable bomb, more like a training film for retired French whores than anything else." On Rotten Tomatoes, the film holds an approval rating of 25% based on 12 reviews, with an average rating of 4.8/10.

Box officeSextette'' earned $31,000 in its first week, largely due to West's appearance at the premiere. The film earned about an additional $20,000 in the United States before being pulled from theaters. Against its budget of $4 million to $8 million, it was a box-office bomb.

Hughes later wrote "May God bless Mae West. She was one of the great artists of the cinema. I am proud to have met her and to have worked with her. May she never be forgotten."

References

External links

Sextette at Letterboxd

1978 films
1970s musical comedy films
American musical comedy films
Crown International Pictures films
American films based on plays
Films directed by Ken Hughes
Films set in London
1978 comedy films
1970s English-language films
1970s American films